Ladushkin is a town in Kaliningrad Oblast, Russia, located between Kaliningrad and the Polish border. Population figures:

History
It was founded as Ludwigsort (lit. Ludwig's/Louis' place) in 1314 and is situated not far from the shores of the Vistula Lagoon and the ruins of the medieval Balga Castle erected by the Teutonic Knights. In 1454, King Casimir IV Jagiellon incorporated the region to the Kingdom of Poland upon the request of the anti-Teutonic Prussian Confederation. After the subsequent Thirteen Years' War (1454–1466), the settlement was a part of Poland as a fief held by the Teutonic Knights until 1525, and by secular Ducal Prussia afterwards. From the 18th century, it was part of the Kingdom of Prussia, and from 1871 it was also part of Germany, within which it was administratively located in the province of East Prussia.

After the transfer of the town to the Russian Soviet Federative Socialist Republic following World War II, it was renamed Ladushkin in 1946 after the Red Army soldier Ivan Ladushkin (:ru:Ладушкин, Иван Мартынович) who was killed nearby during the East Prussian Offensive in the previous year.

Administrative and municipal status
Within the framework of administrative divisions, it is, together with two rural localities, incorporated as the town of oblast significance of Ladushkin—an administrative unit with the status equal to that of the districts. As a municipal division, the town of oblast significance of Ladushkin is incorporated as Ladushkinsky Urban Okrug.

References

Notes

Sources

Cities and towns in Kaliningrad Oblast